Pseudoceros scriptus  is a marine flatworm species that belongs to the Pseudocerotidae family. 
This species is commonly known as the script flatworm.

Distribution 
Tropical Indo-Pacific, from the Archipelago of Maldives to  Australia.

Habitat 
External slope or top of coral reefs.

Size 

Physical characteristics 
"External anatomy: Cream yellowish background fading to white towards the margin with irregular black maculae on either side of the median line and an orange marginal band. The ventral side is cream becoming darker towards the margin and a wide orange marginal band. The pseudotentacles are formed by simple folds of the anterior margin. Cerebral cluster with about 40 eyespots. Pharynx is formed by elaborated folds.
Internal anatomy: The male system is formed by unbranched vas deferens, an oblong seminal vesicle, an oval prostatic vesicle, and a short cuticular stylet housed in a deep, folded, and voluminous antrum. The female antrum is shallow with a narrow and short vagina surrounded by the cement glands."

Behaviour 
Benthic, diurnals, because of its aposematic colors, it has no fear to crawl around to feed.

Feeding 
Pseudoceros scriptus feeds on various colonial ascidians.

External links 

 Life Desk, Pseudoceros scriptus 
 Discover Life, Pseudoceros scriptus 
 Turbellarian taxonomic database, Pseudoceros scriptus

Bibliographical References 
 Leslie Newman & Lester Cannon, "Marine Flatworms",CSIRO publishing,2003,
 Neville Coleman, "Marine life of Maldives",Atoll editions,2004,
 Andrea & Antonnella Ferrrari,"Macrolife",Nautilus publishing,2003,

Turbellaria
Animals described in 1998